The C 14-class missile boat is a light missile boat of catamaran designed for use in the Middle East, also known as the China Cat class. The small size of the ship, along with some stealth features provide it with good protection against enemy detection, and it can be armed with a variety of light anti-ship missiles.  In addition to the low radar cross section, the boat is also extremely fast with an aluminum monohull with stepped planning. 

The catamaran design also provides better seaworthiness in comparison to the other boats of similar displacement with a conventional hull. The missile boats have been exported to Iran, where since 2000 it has been in service with the Islamic Revolutionary Guards Navy Corps.  In Chinese service it primarily serves as a trial boat, including testing various light anti-ship missiles and other weaponry for catamarans.

The boats were reportedly first seen in Iran in May 2002, and western sources assumed that a number of these vessels were delivered by China.

Sources

 Global Security
 Iran's Naval Forces
 Combat Fleets 16th Ed.: Iranian Frigates and Patrol Craft
 

Missile boats of the People's Liberation Army Navy
Missile boat classes
Missile boats of the Islamic Republic of Iran Navy
Ship classes of the Islamic Revolutionary Guard Corps
Ships built by Marine Industries Organization
China–Iran military relations